The Circle's End [aka The Higher Law] is a 1914 silent film drama short directed by and starring Romaine Fielding. His costar was actress Mary Ryan from Broadway. It was produced by the Lubin Manufacturing Company and distributed by the General Film Company.

Cast
Romaine Fielding - Tom Gaynor
Mary Ryan - Mary Butts, The Sheriff's Daughter
Edmund Cobb - The Bandit
Al Jacoby - Sheriff Butts
Jesse Robinson -

References

External links
 The Circle's End at IMDb.com

1914 films
Lubin Manufacturing Company films
American silent short films
American black-and-white films
Films directed by Romaine Fielding
Silent American drama films
1914 drama films
1914 short films
1910s American films
1910s English-language films